Howardsville is an unincorporated community in San Juan County, Colorado, United States, along the Animas River at the mouth of Cunningham Creek.

Description
Established and laid out by the Bullion City Company as Bullion City in 1874, it was renamed later in the year, either for Lieutenant Howard, a once-prominent local figure, or for George Howard, who once had a cabin in the area.  It was the first county seat of San Juan County, holding that title until 1875. The Silverton Northern Railroad laid tracks to reach Howardsville in 1896, with an extension getting built from Howardsville into Cunningham Gulch to reach the Old Hundred Mine, along with the Green Mountain Mine, in 1905. The town would be sustained for the remainder of its life by the Pride Of The West Mill and the Little Nation Tram House & Mill, among other mines & mills. The town effectively died in 1939 when its post office shut down, and the Silverton Northern Railroad tracks would get torn up in 1942.

See also

References

External links

 Full Resolution Ghost Town and Historic Site Photos by Coloradopast.com

Unincorporated communities in San Juan County, Colorado
Unincorporated communities in Colorado